Bob Collins (3 January 1937 – 16 September 2018) was an Australian rules footballer who played with Fitzroy in the Victorian Football League (VFL).

Notes

External links 

1937 births
Australian rules footballers from Victoria (Australia)
Fitzroy Football Club players
2018 deaths